The 15 cm Schnelladekanone Länge 35, abbreviated as 15 cm SK L/35, was a German naval gun developed in the years before World War I that armed a variety of warships from different nations.  The navies of Austria-Hungary, China, Denmark, Japan, The Netherlands, The Ottoman Empire, Romania and Spain all used this gun.

History
In 1880 Krupp designed the 15 cm SK L/35 and started production in 1883 to arm protected cruisers, turret ships and coastal defense ships then under construction. It was also used to rearmed a number of earlier iron clad warships. By breaking the ammunition down into two pieces the rate of fire was improved and crew workload was eased.

Naval Use

German Empire
 Irene-class - This class of two protected cruisers had two 15 cm SK L/35 guns per side, amidships as their primary armament after 1899-1905 refits.
 SMS Kaiserin Augusta - This protected cruiser had six 15 cm SK L/35 guns per side, amidships as its primary armament after an 1896 refit.

Austria-Hungary
 Kaiser Franz Joseph I-class - This class of two protected cruisers had three 15 cm SK L/35 guns per side, amidships as their secondary armament.
 SMS Kaiserin Und Konigin Maria Theresia - This armored cruiser had four 15 cm SK L/35 guns per side, amidships as its secondary armament.
 SMS Kronprinzessin Erzherzogin Stephanie - This ironclad had three 15 cm SK L/35 guns per side, amidships as its secondary armament.

China
 Chih Yuen - This protected cruiser had one shielded 15 cm SK L/35 gun per side, amidships as its secondary armament.
 Dingyuan-class - This class of two ironclads had a secondary armament of one 15 cm SK L/35 at the bow and stern.
 Kuang Yuan-class - This class of four gunboats had one 15 cm SK L/35 as their primary armament.
 Lai Yuen - This protected cruiser had one shielded 15 cm SK L/35 gun per side, amidships as its secondary armament.
 Pao Min - This cruiser had a primary armament of one forward 15 cm SK L/35 and a second gun on the quarterdeck.
 Ping Yuen - This gunboat had one shielded 15 cm SK L/35 gun per side, amidships as its secondary armament.
 Tsi Yeun - This protected cruiser had one shielded 15 cm SK L/35 gun, aft as its secondary armament.
 Wei Yuen-class - This class of six sloops were each refitted with two 15 cm SK L/35 guns.
 Zhenyuan - This turret ship had one shielded 15 cm SK L/35 gun, fore and aft as its secondary armament.

Denmark
 HDMS Fyen - This unprotected cruiser mounted two 15 cm SK L/35 guns as its primary armament.
 HDMS Gorm - This monitor had two 15 cm SK L/35 guns mounted in a central turret amidships as its primary armament after a 1903 refit.
 HDMS Hekla - This protected cruiser had one 15 cm SK L/35 gun, fore and aft as its primary armament.
 HDMS Valkyrien - This protected cruiser had three 15 cm SK L/35 guns per side, amidships as its secondary armament.

Japan
 Naniwa-class - The two ships of this class of protected cruisers had three 15 cm SK L/35 guns per side, amidships as their secondary armament.

The Netherlands
 Evertsen-class - This class of three coastal defense ships had one 15 cm SK L/35 gun per side, amidships as their secondary armament.
 HNLMS Sumatra -  This protected cruiser had one shielded 21 cm L/35 gun fore and one shielded 15 cm SK L/35 gun aft as its primary armament.

The Ottoman Empire
 Hamidiye - This central battery ironclad had five 15 cm SK L/35 guns per side as secondary armament.
 Iclaliye - This central battery ironclad was refitted with two 15 cm SK L/35 guns.

Romania
 NMS Elisabeta - This protected cruisers primary armament consisted of two 15 cm SK L/35 guns per side, in sponsons amidships.

Spain
 Aragon-class - In 1885 two ships of the Aragon-class of unprotected cruisers the Navarra and Castilla were refitted with two 15 cm SK L/35 guns per side, amidships as their primary armament.

Land use
In addition to its naval artillery role the 15 cm SK L/35 was also used as coastal artillery in either armored gun turrets or on garrison mounts.  The garrison mount consisted of a rectangular steel firing platform which sat on a concrete slab behind a parapet with a pivot at the front and two wheels at the rear to give a limited amount of traverse.  The recoil system consisted of a U shaped gun cradle which held the trunnioned barrel and a slightly inclined firing platform with a hydro-gravity recoil system.  When the gun fired the hydraulic buffers under the front slowed the recoil of the cradle which slid up a set of inclined rails on the firing platform and then returned the gun to position by the combined action of the buffers and gravity.

Ammunition 
Ammunition was of separate quick loading type with a cased charge and projectile.

The gun was able to fire:
 Armor Piercing - 
 Common shell - 
 Shrapnel -

Photo Gallery

Notes

References
 

150 mm artillery
World War I naval weapons
Naval guns of Austria-Hungary
Naval guns of Germany